Richard Alfred Absher, Jr.  (born April 19, 1944) is a former American football linebacker (and sometimes kicker) in the National Football League for the Washington Redskins, Atlanta Falcons, New Orleans Saints, and the Philadelphia Eagles.  He played college football at the University of Maryland and was drafted in the fifth round of the 1967 NFL Draft by the Eagles.

Absher played for the New Orleans Saints when Tom Dempsey made his record-breaking kick of 63 yards against the Detroit Lions on November 8, 1970.

References

1944 births
Living people
American football linebackers
Atlanta Falcons players
Maryland Terrapins football players
New Orleans Saints players
Philadelphia Eagles players
Players of American football from Washington, D.C.
Washington Redskins players